Hybomitra sonomensis is a species of horse flies in the family Tabanidae.

Distribution
Canada, United States

References

Tabanidae
Diptera of North America
Taxa named by Carl Robert Osten-Sacken
Insects described in 1877